The United Nations Capital Development Fund (UNCDF) makes public and private finance work for the poor in the world's 46 least developed countries (LDCs).

With its capital mandate and instruments, UNCDF offers “last mile” finance models that unlock public and private resources, especially at the domestic level, to reduce poverty and support local economic development. This last mile is where available resources for development are scarcest; where market failures are most pronounced; and where benefits from national growth tend to leave people excluded.

UNCDF's financing models work through two channels: savings-led financial inclusion that expands the opportunities for individuals, households, and small businesses to participate in the local economy, providing them with the tools they need to climb out of poverty and manage their financial lives; and by showing how localized investments—through fiscal decentralization, innovative municipal finance, and structured project finance—can drive public and private funding that underpins local economic expansion and sustainable development. UNCDF financing models are applied in thematic areas where addressing barriers to finance at the local level can have a transformational effect for poor and excluded people and communities.

By strengthening how finance works for poor people at the household, small enterprise, and local infrastructure levels, UNCDF contributes to SDG 1 on eradicating poverty with a focus on reaching the last mile and addressing exclusion and inequalities of access. At the same time, UNCDF deploys its capital finance mandate in line with SDG 17 on the means of implementation, to unlock public and private  nance for the poor at the local level. By identifying those market segments where innovative financing models can have transformational impact in helping to reach the last mile, UNCDF contributes to a number of different SDGs and currently to 28 of 169 targets.

Established by the General Assembly in 1966 and with headquarters in New York City, UNCDF is an autonomous UN organization affiliated with UNDP.

The original UNCDF mandate from the UN General Assembly (UNGA) is to “assist developing countries in the development of their economies by supplementing existing sources of capital assistance by means of grants and loans” (General Assembly Resolution 2186, 13 December 1966). The mandate was modified in 1973 to serve first and foremost but not exclusively the LDCs.

The current Executive Secretary of UNCDF is Preeti Sinha.

History 

Created by the General Assembly in 1966 to promote economic development, UNCDF officially was established as an "autonomous organization within the United Nations" with the purpose to "assist developing countries in the development of their economies by supplementing existing sources of capital assistance by means of grants and loans".

In 1973, the Governing Council reorients UNCDF's activities towards "first and foremost the least developed among the developing countries" and it began focusing on the world's least developed countries in 1974.

For the next twenty years, UNCDF financed stand-alone capital infrastructure—roads, bridges, irrigation schemes—mostly in Africa. It received about $40 million in core funding per year and operated out of UNDP country offices.

In the mid-1990s, UNCDF began focusing on the role local governments could play in planning, financing, and maintaining capital investments. Promoting effective infrastructure investment and service delivery via decentralized public financial management has been UNCDF's mainstay ever since. UNCDF's other major area of expertise—microfinance—also dates to the mid-1990s, when many of its rural development projects had credit components.

UNCDF's resources remain modest compared to many multilateral organizations. However, it has developed a considerable track record of going where others do not, and then “leveraging in” larger sources of public and private capital. In the words of a 2008 assessment by the Government of Sweden, “UNCDF should be seen as a development actor that paves the way for others, rather than a financing mechanism.”

In 2013, UNCDF received the highest score in the SmartAid for Microfinance Index, a measure of overall effectiveness in microfinance.

UNCDF today operates in 31 of the world's 46 least developed countries. 70 percent of its portfolio is in Africa. On 13 December 2016, UNCDF commemorated its 50th Anniversary.

References

Microfinance organizations
Organizations established in 1966
Organizations established by the United Nations
United Nations Development Group